Elite Xtreme Combat, also known as EliteXC, was a United States-based mixed martial arts (MMA) organization owned and operated by ProElite. It was founded as a partnership between Showtime Networks and ProElite and officially announced on December 14, 2006. It was headquartered in Los Angeles.

The partnership to form EliteXC was announced on November 13, 2006. The first major event occurred February 10, 2007 at the DeSoto Civic Center in Southaven, Mississippi. Fighters Frank Shamrock and Renzo Gracie fought in the main event. Also debuting on this card was Charles Bennett, K. J. Noons, Mike Pyle and Antônio Silva.

In early 2008, EliteXC had reached an agreement with CBS to broadcast EliteXC shows on prime time. The arrangement was that CBS would broadcast EliteXC specials every other month on Saturday nights. CBS aired only three events in 2008, on May 31, July 26, and October 4.

EliteXC events
This is a list of events held and scheduled by Elite Xtreme Combat (EliteXC), a mixed martial arts organization based in the United States. The first event took place in February 2007. The list includes three events that EliteXC co-promoted (Dynamite!! USA, Strikeforce Shamrock vs. Baroni, and Strikeforce: Shamrock vs. Le) with other MMA organizations. Two events were shown initially on pay-per-view, while the others aired on the Showtime cable network or on CBS.

ShoXC

On July 11, 2007, it was announced that Proelite.com and Showtime would produce a new series titled ShoXC.  The monthly shows featured up-and-coming MMA talent, similar to Showtime's ShoBox boxing events. The first took place on July 27, 2007. The first event was co-promoted with King of the Cage and was also known as KOTC: Undisputed.

Partnership with Cage Rage
On September 7, 2007, ProElite, Inc. announced that they had officially acquired British MMA organization Cage Rage Championships. EliteXC and Cage Rage Championships planned numerous joint ventures together, beginning with Cage Rage 23.

Partnership with DREAM
On May 10, 2008 EliteXC announced a working partnership with Japanese  promotion Dream. The two groups intended to share fighters (Eddie Alvarez, Jason Miller and Nick Diaz have already participated in Dream events) and eventually co-promote shows.

Co-promoting with Affliction
On September 24, 2008 EliteXC announced a working partnership with rival US promotion Affliction. Affliction offered Andrei Arlovski vs. Roy Nelson for the EliteXC: Heat card on CBS. In addition, Affliction heavily promoted their line through commercials on the show. It was hoped that the two companies would survive a rocky financial situation long enough to co-promote fights again in the future.

Controversy and Closing of EliteXC 
On October 4, 2008, EliteXC's biggest ratings draw Kimbo Slice was knocked out just 14 seconds into his bout with Seth Petruzelli. Petruzelli served as a last-minute replacement for MMA pioneer Ken Shamrock, who got injured on the day of the fight and was unable to compete. The unexpected outcome of this fight drew a great deal of attention, and subsequent comments by Petruzelli that he was offered a monetary bonus to employ certain techniques during the fight (comments he later recanted and obfuscated), raised the question of undue influence by EliteXC representatives in fights. Significant debt incurred by parent company Pro Elite with no investors or buyers showing interest caused the subsequent cancellation of the November 8, 2008 event. Combined with the Florida State Athletic Commission launching an investigation into the Slice/Petruzelli fight, Pro Elite announced on October 20, 2008 that they would cease operations.

Weight classes

EliteXC champions

Heavyweight Championship
Weight limit: Unlimited

Middleweight Championship 
Weight limit:

Welterweight Championship
Weight limit:

Lightweight Championship
Weight limit:

Bantamweight Championship
Weight limit:

Women's division

Shayna Baszler
Gina Carano
Marloes Coenen
Tonya Evinger
Takayo Hashi
Sarah Kaufman
Debi Purcell
Cris Cyborg
Kaitlin Young

See also
 Mixed Martial Arts
 List of current mixed martial arts champions
 List of Bellator MMA champions
 List of Invicta FC champions
 List of ONE Championship champions
 List of Pride champions
 List of PFL champions
 List of Strikeforce champions
 List of UFC champions
 List of WEC champions
 Mixed martial arts weight classes

Footnotes

External links
Former Official EliteXC Site as captured by archive.org
Official Showtime Networks, Inc. Site

Sports organizations established in 2006
Mixed martial arts organizations
Organizations disestablished in 2008
Mixed martial arts events lists